Proturentomon pectinatum is a species of proturan in the family Protentomidae. It is found in Africa, Europe, and Northern Asia (excluding China).

References

Protura
Articles created by Qbugbot
Animals described in 1948